Atheris subocularis is a species of snake in the family Viperidae. It is endemic to Cameroon.

References

subocularis
Snakes of Africa
Reptiles of Cameroon
Endemic fauna of Cameroon
Reptiles described in 1888
Taxa named by Johann Gustav Fischer